Senator Pillsbury may refer to:

Albert E. Pillsbury (1849–1930), Massachusetts State Senate
Charles Alfred Pillsbury (1842–1899), Minnesota State Senate
George S. Pillsbury (1921–2012), Minnesota State Senate
Gilbert Pillsbury (1813–1893), Massachusetts State Senate
John S. Pillsbury (1827–1901), Minnesota State Senate